Iron tests are groups of clinical chemistry laboratory blood tests that are used to evaluate body iron stores or the iron level in blood serum.

Other terms used for the same tests are iron panel, iron profile, iron indices, iron status or iron studies.

Tests
 Serum iron
 Ferritin
 Transferrin
 Total iron-binding capacity (TIBC)
 Transferrin saturation (Iron saturation of transferrin)
 Unsaturated iron binding capacity (UIBC)
 Transferrin receptor (TfR)

Related tests
 Complete blood count (CBC), especially:
 Hemoglobin, EVF or total red blood cells (RBC count)
 Mean corpuscular volume (MCV)
 Mean corpuscular hemoglobin (MCH) or MCHC

Diagnosis

* = or normal.

See also
 Reference ranges for blood tests#Ions and trace metals, for reference ranges for tests above

References

 Iron Level Blood Test - Personal Home Medical Tests - testnord.co.uk
Blood tests
Iron metabolism